Porrorhynchus indicans, is a species of whirligig beetle found in Sri Lanka.

Description
Length of male is 16.6 to 19.2 mm whereas female is 15.1 to 17.0 mm. Body elongate oval, and weakly convex laterally. Dorsally head, pronotum, and elytra are olive green. Pronotum and basal parts of elytra possess yellowish lateral margins. Ventral surface yellowish to red-dish orange in color. Vertex with sparse, weakly impressed punctures. Clypeus with sparse punctation. Antenna consists with seven flagellomeres. Yellowish lateral margins are incomplete on elytra. Elytral apices with blunt parasutural point, without spines. Pronotum with shallow, weakly impressed wrinkles. Females are smaller insize and much more parallel-sided in body form.

References 

Gyrinidae
Insects of Sri Lanka
Insects described in 1858